Cryptandra intonsa is a flowering plant in the family Rhamnaceae and is endemic to inland Western Australia. It is an erect or spreading shrub with linear to narrowly oblong leaves and white or cream-coloured, tube-shaped flowers arranged in head-like clusters.

Description
The upper surface of the leaves is minutely pimply, the lower surface mostly concealed, and there is a prominent, downcurved point on the tip.

Taxonomy and naming
Cryptandra intonsa was first formally described in 1995 by Barbara Lynette Rye in the journal Nuytsia from specimens collected in 1993. The specific epithet (intonsa ) means "unshaved" or "bristly", referring to the appearance of the young stems.

Distribution and habitat
This cryptandra grows in heath with scattered mallees and is found from near Middle Iron Cap to near Hatters Hill in the Coolgardie and Mallee bioregions of inland Western Australia.

Conservation status
Cryptandra intonsa is listed as "not threatened" by the Government of Western Australia Department of Biodiversity, Conservation and Attractions.

References

intonsa
Rosales of Australia
Flora of Western Australia
Plants described in 1995
Taxa named by Barbara Lynette Rye